The 2010 Tennessee gubernatorial election took place on November 2, 2010. Incumbent Democratic Governor Phil Bredesen was term-limited and unable to seek re-election to a third term in office. Knoxville mayor Bill Haslam, the Republican nominee, defeated Democratic nominee Mike McWherter.

News organizations The Cook Political Report, CQ Politics, and The New York Times rated the gubernatorial election as leaning Republican, while The Rothenberg Political Report rated it as "Republican favored," RealClearPolitics and Sabato's Crystal Ball as "Likely Republican", and Rasmussen Reports as "Solid Republican."

Primary election
The primary election was held on August 5, 2010.
A recorded debate Featuring 3 of the candidates, organized by campaign coordinator James Crenshaw, was held at the Scarett-Benett Center in Nashville, TN.

Democratic primary

Candidates
Mike McWherter, businessman, former attorney, son of former Governor Ned McWherter

Republican primary

Candidates
Bill Haslam, Mayor of Knoxville
Joe Kirkpatrick, businessman Withdrew from race
Basil Marceaux, Soddy Daisy resident
Ron Ramsey, Lieutenant Governor
Zach Wamp, U.S. Representative, 3rd district

Polling

Results

Independents
Bayron Binkley, broker
Brandon Dodds, optometrist
Samuel David Duck, Independent Federalist (withdrew from race and endorsed Brandon Dodds)
David Gatchell
June Griffin
Toni Hall
Floyd Knois
Boyce McCall
J. David Maharrey, Tea Party
Linda Kay Perry
James Reesor, Tennessee author
Thomas Smith II
Howard Switzer, Architect (Green Party nominee; listed on the ballot as an independent)
Carl Twofeathers Whitaker, Native American Indian Movement chief

General election

Predictions

Polling

Results

References

External links
Tennessee Department of State – Elections
Tennessee Governor Candidates at Project Vote Smart
Campaign contributions for 2010 Tennessee Governor from Follow the Money
Tennessee Governor 2010 from OurCampaigns.com
2010 Tennessee General Election graph of multiple polls from Pollster.com
Election 2010: Tennessee Governor from Rasmussen Reports
2010 Tennessee Governor – Haslam vs. McWherter from Real Clear Politics
2010 Tennessee Governor's Race from CQ Politics
Race Profile in The New York Times
Debates
Tennessee Gubernatorial Debate on C-SPAN, July 12, 2010
Tennessee Gubernatorial Debate  including independent candidates on IRN, May 23, 2010
Official campaign websites (Archived)
Bill Haslam for Governor
Mike McWherter for Governor
Samuel David Duck for Governor
James Reesor for Governor
Carl "Two Feathers" Whitaker for Governor

Gubernatorial
2010
2010 United States gubernatorial elections